John Carroll Walsh (December 22, 1816 – December 1, 1894) was a politician and farmer from Baltimore. He served in the Maryland Senate in 1868 and from 1874 to 1876.

Early life
John Carroll Walsh was born on December 22, 1816, in Baltimore to John Walsh. He was named after his father's friend, Archbishop John Carroll. His father was a lumber dealer. Walsh graduated from Georgetown University and went west.

Career
Walsh returned to Baltimore in 1840 and purchased "The Mound" and two other farms on Gunpowder River. He worked as a farmer.

Walsh was a Democrat. In 1864, Walsh became a member of the Democratic State Central Committee. In February 1866, Walsh was a member of a convention of Maryland representatives asking the state legislature to appeal or modify voter registration laws for people with Southern sympathies. Walsh served in the Maryland Senate, representing Harford County, in 1868 and again from 1874 to 1876. He served as president pro tempore of the senate in 1876. He was appointed to the Governor's staff and received the title of colonel for his service.

Walsh was a director of the Baltimore and Ohio Railroad and served as a trustee of the Maryland Agricultural College. At one point, he worked with John Cox as an editor of The Aegis. He also served as president of the Mutual Fire Insurance Company of Harford County.

Personal life
Walsh married Amanda Lee of Harford County, Maryland. His wife predeceased him. They had three children, Ralph Lee, Harold and Mary Alice.

Walsh died on December 1, 1894, at his "The Mound" home near Jerusalem Mills, Maryland. He was buried at Green Mount Cemetery in Baltimore.

References

1816 births
1894 deaths
Georgetown University alumni
Politicians from Baltimore
Democratic Party Maryland state senators
Editors of Maryland newspapers
19th-century American politicians